Sablé Football Club is a French football club based in Sablé-sur-Sarthe in the Sarthe department.

The club competes in Championnat National 3, the fifth level of French football, after two successive promotions.

History
The Sablé Football Club was founded in 1986 by merger of three clubs: the Sabolienne Star chaired by Gérard Nais; the Association Sportive de Sable chaired by Maurice Pottier (1928–2003); and Sable-Relax.

Current squad

References

External links 
 

Association football clubs established in 1986
1986 establishments in France
Sport in Sarthe
Football clubs in Pays de la Loire